The Ron Hicklin Singers were a group of Los Angeles studio singers contracted and organized by Ron Hicklin.  They are mostly known as the real singers behind the background vocals on The Partridge Family recordings.

In Los Angeles studio circles in the 1960s through 1980s, they were the vocal equivalent of (and often worked with) The Wrecking Crew, performing backup vocals on thousands of songs, TV and movie themes, and as lead (while remaining anonymous) singers on thousands of radio and television commercials.

Cast
The core group usually consisted of (by Voice Type):
 Ron Hicklin - lead tenor
 Tom Bähler  - tenor
 John Bähler - tenor
 Stan Farber - tenor
 Jim Gilstrap - tenor
 Gene Morford - bass
 Al Capps - bass
 Sally Stevens - soprano
 Sandie Hall - soprano
 Carolyn Willis - soprano
 Jackie Ward  - alto
 Debbie Hall - alto
 Myrna Matthews - alto

However, this core group was often augmented with other specialist vocalists such as:
 Jim Haas - tenor
 Jerry Whitman - tenor
 Thurl Ravenscroft - bass (voice of Kellogg's Tony the Tiger of Frosted Flakes cereal for 50 years, and the vocalist for "You're A Mean One, Mr. Grinch")
 Mitch Gordon - bass
 Bob Tebow - bass
 Andra Willis - soprano
 Linda Dangcil - soprano
 Bob Zwirn - baritone
 Gene Merlino - baritone

Often they were not credited, or else were credited under other names. For example, when singing the TV theme of Love, American Style, they were credited as The Charles Fox Singers.

Motion pictures, television and radio work
The group performed themes for major motion pictures in the 1960s, 1970s, 1980s, and 1990s.
 M*A*S*H (film)
Butch Cassidy and the Sundance Kid, "South American Getaway" written by Burt Bacharach
The Hunt For Red October, written by Basil Poledouris
Dances With Wolves, written by John Barry
Apollo 13, written by James Horner
Glory, written by James Horner
Hook, written by John Williams
Dirty Harry, and Magnum Force, written by Lalo Schifrin
Out of Africa, written by John Barry
Death Game, "Dear Old Dad" written by Jimmie Haskell with lyrics by Iris Rainer Dart
The Mosquito Coast, "Saviour, Like a Shepherd Lead Us" written by William Batchelder Bradbury
 Rosemary's Baby

The group also sang the themes for major hit-TV shows of the period:
 Love, American Style, with lead vocalist John Bähler (opening theme)
 Batman, (opening theme)
 Alvin & The Chipmunks
 Flipper
 That Girl, season 5 opening
 Happy Days, for which Jim Haas sang lead (opening theme)
 Laverne & Shirley, along with lead vocalist Cyndi Grecco  (opening theme)
 Wonder Woman, with John Bähler singing lead (season 2 opening)
 Angie, along with lead vocalist Maureen McGovern  (opening theme)

In addition, they sang many commercial vocals, including United States advertising campaigns for:
 Kawasaki - "Kawasaki, Let the Good Times Roll"
 Datsun - "Drive a Datsun, then Decide"
 McDonald's - "You Deserve a Break Today", written by Kenny Karen
 Wheaties - "Go Tell Your Mama What The Big Boys Eat", Clio Award Winner
 California Raisins - "Yum, Yum", 2 Clio Awards
 Gatorade - "Gatorade Is Thirst Aid For That Deep Down Body Thirst"

Radio and television station-ID jingle companies throughout the last four decades of the 20th century used the group in their productions, including:
 The Heller Corporation
 Killer Music Broadcast Division
 JAM Creative Productions
 TM Productions (now known as TM Studios, a division of Dial Global Media) on syndicated-radio ID jingle packages including:
 Hot Hits
 Fusion
 The "You" campaign
 Good Feelings

Noteworthy recording work
The group also sang on recordings credited to:
 Johnny Mandel - "Suicide Is Painless", Theme from M*A*S*H
 The Brady Kids
 Cher - "Dark Lady"
 Climax featuring Sonny Geraci - "Precious and Few" (No. 1, U.S. Cash Box Top 100)
 Anita Kerr Singers [Jackie Ward sang alto on the group's Dot Records recordings]
 Gary Lewis & the Playboys - "This Diamond Ring" (No 1, U.S. Billboard Hot 100), "Count Me In", "Save Your Heart For Me" (No 1, U.S. Billboard Easy Listening), "She's Just My Style", "Everybody Loves A Clown" 
 Mark Lindsay - "Arizona" (RIAA Gold) and "Silver Bird"
 The Partridge Family - "I Think I Love You"
 Gary Puckett & The Union Gap - "Young Girl" (No. 1, U.S. Cash Box Top 100), "Woman, Woman" (No. 3, U.S. Cash Box Top 100),  "Over You" (No. 5, U.S. Cash Box Top 100), and "Lady Willpower" (No. 1, U.S. Cash Box Top 100)
 Paul Revere & the Raiders - "Indian Reservation" (RIAA Gold)
 Ringo Starr - "Oh My My", and "Photograph" (No 1, U.S. Billboard Hot 100)
 Sammy Davis, Jr. - "The Candy Man" (RIAA Gold)
 Johnny Mathis - "There, I Said it Again"
 Neil Diamond - "You Don't Bring Me Flowers" (RIAA Platinum), "Holly Holy", "In My Lifetime"
 The Monkees - "Last Train To Clarksville" (No 1, U.S. Billboard Hot 100), "Valleri" (No. 1, U.S. Cash Box Top 100), "Hey Hey We're The Monkees"

Works of selected members 
The Bähler Brothers were part of the singing group hired by Ron Hicklin on Hugo Montenegro's Albums.

The Bähler Brothers, Jackie Ward, and Ron Hicklin joined David Cassidy as the singers on the Partridge Family.
 Hugo Montenegro's The Good, the Bad and the Ugly Theme
 "MacArthur Park"
 "Suicide Is Painless", Johnny Mandel's theme to the 1970 film M*A*S*H, sung by Ian Freebairn-Smith, Ron Hicklin, John Bähler, and Tom Bähler
 Ron Hicklin did 4 decades as part of the Chipmunks

Member Jackie Ward also had a hit on her own as Robin Ward with the 1963 hit "Wonderful Summer".

Where are they now?
Below information current as of April, 2022.

John Bähler lives in Branson, Missouri and conducts the "new" Lawrence Welk orchestra as well as running Portraits By Bähler.

Bähler's wife, Janet Lennon-Bähler of the Lennon Sisters, still tours in casinos and resorts around the country as part of an extensive nostalgia circuit, bringing music of the 1940s and 1950s to a new audience.

Tom Bähler, a long-time close associate of composer Quincy Jones as well as being associate producer and arranger of "We Are the World", lives in California's Santa Ynez Valley north of Los Angeles and continues to occasionally produce as well as record. He is also a songwriter of renown, having penned the Bobby Sherman hit "Julie, Do Ya Love Me" and Michael Jackson's "She's Out of My Life".

Ron Hicklin himself retired from the business in the mid-1990s, and lives in Rancho Mirage, California and Ko Olina (on Oahu) with his wife, Trudi.

Discography 
Partial chronological list of albums containing one or more cuts with one or more Ron Hicklin Singers:

There were in addition multiple albums for each below:
 Percy Faith Orchestra and Chorus
 Henry Mancini Orchestra and Chorus
 Ray Conniff Singers (20 additional albums)

References

External links
 An interview with Tom Bahler
 An interview with Jackie Ward
 1974 Demonstration Reel
 Mazda 1976 Sales Presentation Music
 KFI Los Angeles "Big Town New Sound"

American vocal groups
The Wrecking Crew (music) members